Still Valentine's Day 1969 is a live album by American folk guitarist Sandy Bull, released in 2006 through Water Records.

Track listing

Personnel 
Matthew Azevedo – mastering
KC Bull – production
Sandy Bull – acoustic guitar, electric guitar, oud
Glenn Jones – mastering
Nathaniel Russell – art direction
Filippo Salvadori – executive production
Pat Thomas – production
Lewis Watts – photography
Baron Wolman – photography

References 

2006 live albums
Sandy Bull albums